Aygut is a village in the Chambarak Municipality of the Gegharkunik Province of Armenia, located to the north of Lake Sevan. The nearby village of Chapkut also belongs to the community of Aygut. The village was populated by Azerbaijanis before the exodus of Azerbaijanis from Armenia after the outbreak of the Nagorno-Karabakh conflict. In 1988-1989 Armenian refugees from Azerbaijan settled in the village.

Gallery

References

External links 

 
 

Populated places in Gegharkunik Province